Peter van der Vlag (born December 5, 1977) is a Dutch former professional footballer who played as a goalkeeper. He is currently the goalkeeper coach of SC Cambuur.

Career
Van der Vlag was born in Leeuwarden. He was part of the youth setup at amateur team, v.v. Wildervank, before turning professional with BV Veendam in the Dutch Eerste Divisie in 1997. He played 145 games for Veendam before moving to Go Ahead Eagles in 2003. After playing for Cambuur Leeuwarden between 2004 and 2009, Van der Vlag returned to his first professional club, Veendam, in 2009.

In July 2011 he re-joined his Veendam head coach Joop Gall by returning at his old club Go Ahead Eagles.

In the summer of 2012, Van der Vlag signed with FC Emmen. He left after two seasons to become second goalkeeper of Eredivisie side FC Groningen

Coaching career
Van der Vlag retired at the end of the 2018–19 season and was then hired as a goalkeeper coach for his former club SC Cambuur.

References

External links
 
 Voetbal International profile 
 

Living people
1977 births
Footballers from Leeuwarden
Dutch footballers
Association football goalkeepers
SC Veendam players
Go Ahead Eagles players
SC Cambuur players
FC Emmen players
FC Groningen players
Eredivisie players
Eerste Divisie players
Derde Divisie players